František Bílkovský (August 10, 1909 in Mrákotín – October 18, 1998 in Brno) was a Czech painter, graphic designer and illustrator.

This modest and extremely prolific artist was born in the family of a shoemaker in the village of Mrákotín. Here he developed his lifelong love—the fascination of horses. Variations on this theme are present throughout the entire body of his work.

After graduating from high school he moved to Brno in 1928 where he worked until his retirement as an engineer and devoted much time to his own artistic creation. He skillfully used almost every known graphic technique, using lithography, etching, drypoint and aquatint etc.

In his life he created over 400 works including some 115 illustrations in books. His works are prized among some collectors of graphic art and some horse enthuasists. His work is represented in private collections, but also in the collections of the National Gallery in Prague, Moravian Gallery in Brno and other major institutions.

He died on 18 October 1998 in Brno and is buried in his native Mrákotín.

See also
List of Czech painters

References

Czech graphic designers
Czech illustrators
Equine artists
1909 births
1998 deaths
20th-century Czech painters
20th-century Czech male artists
Burials in the Czech Republic
Czech male painters
Deaths in the Czech Republic